Soft Kha may refer to:
Kha with descender
Kha with hook
Kha with stroke